Fengshan is a town of Jingxing Mining District, Shijiazhuang, Hebei, People's Republic of China, located in the Taihang Mountains more than  west of downtown Shijiazhuang. , it has 9 residential communities under its administration.

See also
List of township-level divisions of Hebei

References

Township-level divisions of Hebei